Vaughan Williams: A Symphonic Portrait is a 1983 British TV film directed by Ken Russell about Vaughan Williams.

The New York Times said "the film is crammed with lovely touches". Novelist Julian Barnes, then television critic for The Observer, called it "predictable".

References

External links

Vaughan Williams at BFI Screenoline

1983 television films
1983 films
British television documentaries
Films directed by Ken Russell
1980s British films